Trevor G. Browne High School (also known as Trevor Browne High School) is part of the Phoenix Union High School District in Phoenix, Arizona.

History 
The plans for the school were approved by the school board in April 1970. Guirey, Srnka, Arnold & Sprinkle were the architects of the school. The campus featured a revolutionary design with movable walls and multi use spaces. M. M. Sundt Construction Company was general contractor who built the school. The school began to accept students in the fall of 1972, and was named after Trevor Goff Browne, a Canadian-born man who taught at Harvard Medical School. Browne, who died in 1977, donated the land on which Trevor Browne High School was built.

Partner elementary district
 Cartwright

Notable alumni

 Steve Gallardo  – member of the Arizona State Senate
 Marcel Jones – New Orleans Saints (2012–)
 Brandon Kellum – vocalist of the band American Standards
 John Patterson – San Francisco Giants, 1992–95
 CeCe Peniston  –  singer and beauty queen

References

External links
 Trevor G. Browne High School
 Phoenix Union High School District website
 Arizona Department of Education School Report Card
 Facebook
 Twitter

Public high schools in Arizona
Educational institutions established in 1972
High schools in Phoenix, Arizona
1972 establishments in Arizona